Trippy Notes for Bass is the debut solo album of bass guitarist Doug Wimbish, released on August 24, 1999 by On-U Sound Records. On March 3, 2008, the album was re-issued as Trippy Notes for Bass & Remixes on Dude Records.

Track listing

Personnel 

Musicians
Nigel Butler – keyboards, effects, programming
Will Calhoun – drums, percussion, co-producer
Sussan Deyhim – vocals (6, 9)
Alex Foster – saxophone
Keith LeBlanc – drums, percussion
Skip McDonald – guitar, keyboards, editing, co-producer
Adrian Sherwood – keyboards, editing, producer, engineering, mixing
Talvin Singh – tabla, percussion
Doug Wimbish – bass guitar, keyboards, effects, vocals, producer, engineering, mixing
Bernie Worrell – acoustic piano, keyboards

Technical personnel
Alan Branch – editing
Tony Brown – engineering
Darren Grant – engineering
Nick Küpfer – engineering
Andy Montgomery – engineering
Vernon Reid – photography

Release history

References

External links 
 

1999 albums
Doug Wimbish albums
Albums produced by Adrian Sherwood
On-U Sound Records albums